Susana Guerrero Pontivero (born in Sevilla, 1980) is a Spanish former football defender. She played for Club Puebla, CE Sabadell, Levante UD and Atlético Madrid in the Spanish Superleague.

She was a member of the Spanish national team.

Titles
 1 Spanish league (2000)

References

1980 births
Living people
Spanish women's footballers
Spain women's international footballers
Primera División (women) players
CE Sabadell Femení players
Atlético Madrid Femenino players
Levante UD Femenino players
Women's association football defenders
21st-century Spanish women